Power Stone may refer to:

 Power Stone (video game), a 1999 Capcom fighting game
 Power Stone (TV series), an anime based on the game
 Power Stone (Marvel Cinematic Universe), a fictional item in the Marvel universe